Sofia Antonovna Polishchuk (born 21 February 2001) is a Russian competitive ice dancer. With her former skating partner, Alexander Vakhnov, she is the 2017 Junior Grand Prix Final bronze medalist and 2017 JGP Australia champion.

Personal life 
Sofia Antonovna Polishchuk was born on 21 February 2001 in Moscow, Russia.

Career

Early career 
Polishchuk began learning to skate in 2005. She teamed up with Alexander Vakhnov ahead of the 2009–2010 season.

Polishchuk/Vakhnov started competing internationally in the 2010–2011 season, winning the basic novice category at the 2010 NRW Trophy. They made their international junior-level debut during the 2014–2015 season; they won bronze at the 2014 Ice Star and 2014 NRW Trophy.

2015–2016 season 
Polishchuk/Vakhnov received their first ISU Junior Grand Prix (JGP) assignments in the 2015–2016 season. After winning a bronze medal in early September at the JGP in Colorado Springs, United States, they finished fifth three weeks later in Toruń, Poland.

They placed sixth at the 2016 Russian Junior Championships.

2016–2017 season 
Competing in the 2016 JGP series, Polishchuk/Vakhnov won bronze in August in Saint-Gervais-les-Bains, France, and then silver in September in Ljubljana, Slovenia. They placed fourth at the 2017 Russian Junior Championships.

2017–2018 season 
Competing in their ninth season together, Polishchuk/Vakhnov won gold in August at the 2017 JGP event in Brisbane, Australia. They beat the silver medalists, Marjorie Lajoie / Zachary Lagha, by seven points. In October, they won the silver medal at the 2017 JGP event in Egna, Italy. Polishchuk/Vakhnov were beaten by their teammates Arina Ushakova / Maxim Nekrasov by about two points. With these results Polishchuk/Vakhnov qualified for the 2017–2018 ISU Junior Grand Prix Final, where they won the bronze medal after placing third in both segments.

In January 2018, Polishchuk/Vakhnov finished fourth at the 2018 Russian Junior Championships after placing fourth in both segments. They were coached by Svetlana Liapina in Moscow. Their partnership ended by spring 2018.

2018–2019 season 
Polishchuk teamed up with German Shamraev.

In November Polishchuk/Shamraev made their international debut at the 2018 Volvo Open Cup where they finished 5th. In January 2019 they placed 7th at the 2019 Toruń Cup.
In July 2019, Polishchuk's bio appeared on IcePartnerSearch, indicating that she and Shamraev had split, and she did not participate in the 2019-20 season.

Programs

With Vakhnov

Competitive highlights 
JGP: Junior Grand Prix

With Shamraev

With Vakhnov

Detailed results

With Shamraev

With Vakhnov

References

External links 
 

2001 births
Russian female ice dancers
Living people
Figure skaters from Moscow